Diksha (Sanskrit: दीक्षा) also spelled diksa, deeksha or deeksa in common usage, translated as a "preparation or consecration for a religious ceremony", is giving of a mantra or an initiation by the guru (in Guru–shishya tradition) of  Indian religions such as Hinduism, Buddhism, and Jainism. Diksa is given in a one-to-one ceremony, and typically includes the taking on of a serious spiritual discipline. The word is derived from the Sanskrit root dā ("to give") plus kṣi ("to destroy") or alternately from the verb root dīkṣ ("to consecrate"). When the mind of the guru and the disciple become one, then we say that the disciple has been initiated by the guru.
Diksa can be of various types, through the teacher's sight, touch, or word, with the purpose of purifying the disciple or student. Initiation by touch is called sparśa dīkṣā. The bestowing of divine grace through diksa is sometimes called śaktipāt.

Vishnu Yamala (tantra) says:
"The process that bestows divyam jnanam (transcendental, spiritual knowledge) and destroys sin (pāpa), the seed of sin and ignorance, is called diksha by the spiritual persons who have seen the Truth (desikais tattva-kovidaih)."

Different traditions and sects treat diksa in various ways. Tantra mentions five types of initiation or diksa: initiation by a ritual or samaya-diksa; sparsa-diksa is an initiation by touch and is done without a ritual; vag-diksa is done by word or mantra; sambhavi-diksa is arising from perception of external appearance of the guru;  mano-diksa is when initiation is performed in the mind. For ISKCON members first diksa, or harinama-diksa initiation, is performed as part of a fire sacrifice where grains, fruit, and ghee are placed on an open fire of the sacrifice. In the tradition of Lahiri Mahasaya, initiation into Kriya Yoga is given as diksa. The Bengali saint Anandamayi Ma often gave sparśa dīkṣā (divine touch) or drik diksa (through her look), in which she would bestow śaktipāt (divine grace).

Another type of diksha, into a monastic order, involves a vow of celibacy, renunciation of all personal possessions and of all worldly duties, including family ties. Diksha has the same meaning in Jainism. Diksha is also called Charitra or Mahanibhiskraman in Jainism.
Initiation in Hinduism involves performing one of several rituals depending on the person being initiated and the Hindu group involved.

Various tantric works enumerate different types of diksha rituals: 
 Kriyavati
 Kalavati
 Varnamayi
 Vedamayi

Living examples
Transcendental Meditation (TM) began initiation under the guidance of Maharishi Mahesh Yogi in the late 1950s. New members were initiated through a "devotional ritual (puja) whose focus was Brahmananda Saraswati and the Shankarcharya lineage. Initiates were given a specially suited mantra, and taught how to practice meditation."

BAPS Swaminarayan Sanstha initiates new members via a ritual known as vartman. This ritual involves taking water in the right palm and repeating a mantra that is spoken by the ritual initiator, often a renunciate. After the mantra is repeated, the water is poured away, signifying the acceptance of a lifestyle as established by the movement. A kanthi is adorned and vows are taken. Vows for new initiates include abstaining from meat, alcohol, adultery, stealing, and harmful addictive substances.

See also
 Abhisheka
 Brahmin
 Dvija
 Initiation
 Rite of passage
 Parampara
 Ordination
 Shakti
 Tantra

References

Hindu rituals
Buddhist rituals
Rites of passage